Lagnachi Wife Weddingchi Bayku is an Indian Marathi-language television series which was aired on Zee Marathi. It started on 21 October 2019 and ended on 3 April 2020. It was produced by Sanjay Zankar under the banner of Zankar Films.

Cast

Main 
 Vijay Andalkar as Madan Nana Hingankar
 Leeana Anand as Mariya 
 Rupali Zankar as Kajol Madan Hingankar

Recurring 
 Shailesh Korade as Popat Nana Higankar
 Rekha Nirmal as Gaya Nana Hingankar
 Dnyaneshwari Deshpande as Rani Popat Hingankar
 Lalita Amrutkar as Mangal Nana Hingankar
 Sachin Rajpure as Rahul
 Bhanudas Patil as Rahul's father
 Sanket Jagdale as Gopu
 Rupesh Paratwagh as Mithun
 Nikita Kulkarni as Kajol's friend
 Nandkishor Chikhale as Banti

Reception

Adaptations

References

External links 
 Lagnachi Wife Weddingchi Bayku at ZEE5
 

Marathi-language television shows
Zee Marathi original programming
2019 Indian television series debuts
2020 Indian television series endings